Joseph Henry Roberts (February 2, 1871 – October 28, 1923) was an American comic actor who appeared in 16 of Buster Keaton's 19 silent short films of the 1920s.

"Big Joe" Roberts, as he was known in vaudeville, toured the country with his first wife, Lillian Stuart Roberts, as part of a rowdy act known as Roberts, Hays, and Roberts. Their signature routine was "The Cowboy, the Swell and the Lady." At this time, the first decade of the twentieth century, Buster Keaton's father, Joe Keaton, had a summer Actors' Colony for vaudevillians between Lake Michigan and Muskegon Lake in Michigan, where Roberts got to know the Keaton family.

When Buster's apprenticeship with Roscoe "Fatty" Arbuckle came to an end and Keaton began making his own short films in 1920, he asked Roberts to join him. The hefty  Roberts, usually playing a menacing heavy or authority figure, made an amusing contrast next to thin,  Keaton.

Roberts played "Roaring Bill" Rivers in 1922's The Primitive Lover starring Keaton's sister-in-law Constance Talmadge and silent film actor Harrison Ford. He also played a drill master in the Clyde Cook comedy The Misfit, released in March 1924, after Roberts' death.

When Keaton began making feature films in 1923, he apparently intended to keep working with Roberts. Roberts had roles in Keaton's Three Ages and Our Hospitality (both 1923). During the latter's filming, Roberts had a stroke but insisted on returning to the set to finish shooting. After completion, he suffered another stroke and died shortly thereafter, aged 52.

Filmography

References

External links

Joe Roberts at The New York Times Online
Joe Roberts at the Actors' Colony in Muskegon, MI

1871 births
1923 deaths
American male silent film actors
Vaudeville performers
20th-century American male actors
Burials at Hollywood Forever Cemetery